Isopogon alcicornis, commonly known as the elkhorn coneflower, is a plant in the family Proteaceae and is endemic to part of the South Coast Western Australia. It is a low shrub with pinnately-lobed leaves and oval heads of hairy, white or pink flowers.

Description
There are hairy, spatula-shaped involucral bracts at the base of the flowering head.

Taxonomy
Isopogon alcicornis was first formally described in 1903 by Ludwig Diels in Botanische Jahrbücher für Systematik, Pflanzengeschichte und Pflanzengeographie.

Distribution and habitat
Elkhorn coneflower grows in low shrubland on the near Esperance and on Mount Baring near the Cape Arid National Park in the south-west of Western Australia.

Conservation status
This isopogon is classified as "Priority Three" by the Government of Western Australia Department of Parks and Wildlife meaning that it is poorly known and known from only a few locations but is not under imminent threat.

References

alcicornis
Eudicots of Western Australia
Taxa named by Ludwig Diels
Plants described in 1904